Fulke Greville (1717–1806) of Wilbury House, Newton Toney, Wiltshire, England, was an English landowner and diplomat.

He was the son of Algernon Greville and Mary Somerset, daughter and coheiress of Lord Arthur Somerset, the youngest son of Henry Somerset, 1st Duke of Beaufort. His father was a son of Fulke Greville, 5th Baron Brooke. For a time around 1731 he was educated as a gentleman commoner at Winchester College.

His wife was the poet Frances Greville, daughter and coheir of James Macartney, Irish MP for Longford and Granard and his wife Catherine Coote. They eloped on 26 January 1748. They had several children, including:
Frances Anne Greville (born November 1748), married John Crewe, later Lord Crewe and was a noted political hostess
Capt. William Fulke Greville (8 November 1751 – 1837), grandfather of George Greville and father of Fulke Greville-Nugent, 1st Baron Greville
Lt-Col. Henry Francis Greville (10 August 1760 – 13 January 1816)
Capt. Charles Greville (2 November 1762 – 26 August 1832), father of the diarist Charles Cavendish Fulke Greville, Algernon Frederick Greville, and Henry William Greville

He served as Sheriff of Wiltshire in 1744, and as Member of Parliament for Monmouth Boroughs from 1747 to 1754. In 1765, he was appointed envoy extraordinary to the Elector of Bavaria and Minister Plenipotentiary to the Imperial Diet of Ratisbon.

He was the author of Maxims Characters and Reflections (1756).

Further reading

References

External links
 Fulke Greville at the Eighteenth-Century Poetry Archive (ECPA)

1717 births
1806 deaths
British MPs 1747–1754
People from Wiltshire
High Sheriffs of Wiltshire
Members of the Parliament of Great Britain for Welsh constituencies
Ambassadors of Great Britain
Ambassadors to Bavaria
Fulke
People educated at Winchester College